Soltan Mohammad Mirza, also known as Ruzak Mirza or Reza Khodabandeh Mirza, after his grandfather, was the third known son of Safavid Shah Abbas the Great (1588-1629).

He was born in 1597-98 and was blinded in 1620-21 on the orders of his father.

References

Sources
 
 

Safavid princes
Blind royalty and nobility
Iranian blind people
1590s births
17th-century deaths
17th-century Iranian people